Niwot High School (NHS) is a public high school located in Niwot, Colorado. It is the International Baccalaureate high school of the St. Vrain Valley School District.

Background
Niwot High School is situated about halfway between the cities of Boulder and Longmont in the small unincorporated town of Niwot. First opened in 1972, Niwot High School has been a part of the community for over 40 years.

Niwot High School enrolled 1,177 students in the 2019-2020 school year. For students of Sunset Middle School, Niwot High School is the default location to continue their education. The school also attracts students from throughout the school district to participate in its International Baccalaureate program. The number of graduates in each class is typically around 300 students.

History 
The school's original construction was delayed, so for the first semester of the 1972–1973 school year, students attended classes at the Longmont High School building after regular hours. Niwot High School was finished on December 22, 1972. The first class of students was given the honor to choose the school's colors, mascot, and motto. These were two students from each class that was to attend the new school. The colors were kelly green and silver, the mascot was a cougar named "Carrie", and the motto was "Our Pride is Our Life". There were no seniors in the first year because the district did not want to remove current seniors from their home schools to finish their final year in a new school. Thus, the class of 1974 was the first graduating class, and the class of 1976 was the first to have been at Niwot for all four years. The football and baseball team won the conference championship their second year.

The school has had several additions since it was originally constructed; the new commons, auditorium, large gym, and a large portion of the lower wing were added after the school was originally built.

2013 bomb scare
On Wednesday, January 10, 2013, a Niwot High School employee reported a note left on a restroom stall, claiming the "School will blow" on Friday, January 12, 2013. Police searched the building with detection dogs but found no explosive devices. According to authorities, they also found a "hit list" containing the names of 22 students. The school canceled all classes on the 12th, to be "cautious", and to allow the police to conduct a thorough search of the building. A 17-year-old wrestler at the school was arrested in connection with the hit list, but his name was not released because of his age.

Athletics

In 2018, Niwot was runner-up for the BoCoPreps.com Cup, the highest finish in school history.

State championships

Notable alumni 

 Meredith Emerson, murder victim
 Elise Cranny, long-distance runner

References

Public high schools in Colorado
International Baccalaureate schools in Colorado
Schools in Boulder County, Colorado
Educational institutions established in 1972